Deer Creek is a tributary of Big Creek in Norfolk County, Ontario, Canada. It is one of the watercourses managed by the Long Point Region Conservation Authority (LPRCA).  The LPRCA operates the  Deer Creek Conservation Authority.

Deer Creek was dammed in 1969, creating an  reservoir.  The reservoir is in a forested area, and the Conservation Authority opened campsites, available for campers.  Canoes can be rented.  Fishing is allowed.

References

Long Point Region Conservation Authority
Rivers of Ontario
Watercourses
Landforms of Norfolk County, Ontario